Since becoming a foundation club of the Victorian Football League (VFL)—which is now known as the Australian Football League (AFL)—in 1897, there have been 1104 players who have represented the Geelong Football Club in a senior VFL/AFL match. A senior VFL/AFL match is an Australian rules football match between two clubs that are, or were at the time, members of the VFL/AFL. A senior VFL/AFL match is played under the laws of Australian football, and includes regular season matches, as well as finals series matches. It doesn't include pre-season competition matches, Night Series matches, interstate matches or international rules football matches. The list is arranged in the order in which each player made his debut for Geelong in a senior VFL/AFL match. Where more than one player made his debut in the same match, those players are listed alphabetically by surname.

Geelong's first game was played against the Essendon Football Club at Corio Oval in Geelong, Victoria. In this game they scored three goals and six points for a total of 24 points, and were defeated by Essendon who scored seven goals and five points for a total of 47 points. Geelong has contested 19 VFL/AFL Grand Finals, and have succeeded in winning 10 of these Grand Finals to claim the VFL/AFL premiership for those years. Their first premiership was won in the 1925 VFL Grand Final, with the most recent premiership being won in the 2022 AFL Grand Final. There were 123 players who have played in a premiership-winning side for Geelong before 2022, with the addition of 20 more players stemming from the 2022 premiership victory.

Players

1890s

1900s

1910s

1920s

1930s

1940s

1950s

1960s

1970s

1980s

1990s

2000s

2010s

2020s

Other players

Currently listed players

Delisted players 

 * Nominated rookie (Elevated to senior list during season, eligible for senior selection)

See also 

 List of Geelong Football Club captains

Notes

References 
General

 

Specific